This is a list of the Brazil's indigenous or native peoples.

This is a sortable listing of peoples, associated language families, indigenous locations, and population estimates with dates. A particular group listing may include more than one area because the group is distributed in more than one area.

Background
The indigenous peoples in Brazil comprise a large number of distinct ethnic groups, who have inhabited the country prior to the European. The word índios ("Indians"), was by then established to designate the people of the Americas and is still used today in the Portuguese language to designate these peoples, while the people of Asiatic India are called indianos. 

At the time of first European contact, some of the indigenous peoples were traditionally semi-nomadic tribes who subsisted on hunting, fishing, gathering, agriculture, and arboriculture. Many of the estimated 2,000 nations and tribes which existed in the 16th century died out as a consequence of the European settlement. Most of the indigenous population died due to European diseases and warfare, declining from an estimated pre-Columbian high of millions to some 300,000 in 1997, grouped into some 200 tribes. A few tribes were assimilated into the Brazilian population.

In 2007, FUNAI reported that it had confirmed the presence of 67 different uncontacted tribes in Brazil, an increase from 40 in 2005. With this addition Brazil has now surpassed New Guinea as the country having the largest number of uncontacted peoples.
 
Seven Terras Indígenas (TI) (Reservations) are exclusively reserved for isolated people:
TI Alto Tarauacá in Acre – Various tribes. (Isolados do Alto Tarauacá)
TI Hi-Merimã in Amazonas – Himerimã. (Isolados do médio Purus)
TI Massaco in Rondônia – Sirionó (Isolados do rio São Simão)
TI Igarapé Omerê in Rondônia – Kanoe do Omerê & Akuntsu
TI Rio Muqui in Rondônia – Isolados das cabeceiras do rio Muqui (Given as Miqueleno-Kujubim in the table).
TI Rio Pardo in Mato Grosso and Amazonas – Isolados do Rio Pardo (Tupi–Guarani–Kawahibi).
TI Xinane isolados in Acre – Unidentified.

Table of indigenous peoples of Brazil

See also
List of indigenous territories (Brazil)

References

External links
Table of the Indigenous peoples, Povos Indígenas no Brasil

 
Brazil
Indigenous peoples